Gay Men of African Descent (GMAD) is the largest and oldest African American organization dedicated exclusively to the well being of Black gay men. GMAD was founded in 1986 in New York City by the Reverend Charles Angel. The group worked to address the unique issues to Black gay men in America through educational, social, and political mobilization.

History
As a social service organization, GMAD was created to provide community. Since the mid 1980s to present, an ongoing event includes their weekly "Friday Night Forums." This event provides opportunity for community members to dialogue about a number of topics from relationships, aging, sex, HIV/AIDS, parenting, homophobia, and more. Early services also included providing primary prevention services through outreach to the Black gay community. Today the organization continues to provide outreach education, along with HIV testing, syphilis screening, and therapy. In 2011, the Schomburg Center for Research in Black Culture held an event to mark the twenty-fifth anniversary of GMAD. As of 2012, GMAD's Mission Statement "to empower gay men of African-Descent through education, advocacy, health and wellness promotion, and social support."

See also

 African-American culture and sexual orientation

References

Further reading

External links
 
 
 

1986 establishments in New York City
African-American history in New York City
African-American LGBT organizations
Gay culture in New York (state)
Gay men's organizations
LGBT organizations in the United States
Men's organizations in the United States
Organizations based in New York City
Organizations established in 1986